Aigbe Oliha (born 11 February 1993) is a Nigerian football player who plays for ES Zarzis in the Tunisian Professional league.

International career

Oliha represented Nigeria at the Under 17 World Cup in 2009. He played in 7 games and Nigeria reached the final where they lost 1–0 to Switzerland. He was also called by Nigeria for the 2013 African U-20 Championship.

References 

1993 births
Living people
ES Zarzis players
Association football defenders
Nigerian footballers
Nigerian expatriate footballers
Expatriate footballers in Tunisia